The epistemic virtues, as identified by virtue epistemologists, reflect their contention that belief is an ethical process, and thus susceptible to the intellectual virtue or vice of one's own life and personal experiences. Some epistemic virtues have been identified by W. Jay Wood, based on research into the medieval tradition. Virtues are generally defined by good moral character and epistemic virtues are otherwise defined as intellectual virtues.

Foundations of Epistemology 
The foundation for epistemic virtues is epistemology, the theory of what we know to be true according to our own perception in relation to reality. Philosophers are interested in how the mind relates to reality. They focus on questions such as do we know things, how do we know things and when do we know these things. Their main concern is the overall nature of knowledge. Epistemology battles with skepticism by trying to come up with a base on which all knowledge and science can be built up on. Skepticism promotes an impasse to this because we must doubt what we know in order to know if what we know is indeed true.

Epistemic Virtues and Well-Being 
Epistemic virtue is a system of systems of dispositions. An epistemically virtuous person is someone who is determined to find out what's true without having to question their own personal truth or be swayed by self-interest or feelings. There is an apparent tension between these two concepts because there are numerous times where the truth can make a person worse off. Without a doubt we all know of a moment where remaining ignorant was the better option as opposed to knowing the truth. An example of this would be a person being better off not knowing that their significant other is being unfaithful, some people would  prefer to live in the lie because it would affect them less.

The epistemically virtuous person is more concerned with searching for the truth without being swayed by self-interest or other outside elements. A happy person would rather let some truths go unnoticed in the hopes of deceiving themselves for the sake of maintaining relationships and to repress any other feelings that may cause them to feel bad.

Virtues vs Epistemic Virtues 
Virtues and epistemic virtues are two very distinct things that can be difficult to tell apart if not familiar with Epistemology and what it is first. Virtue is defined as a trait or quality that is seen to be morally right and is therefore considered to be a virtues trait. Now an epistemic virtue is the idea that our beliefs go through an ethical process and because of this they are influenced by our beliefs, personal virtues and just our own personal experiences. Virtues are more about the behavior and moral character and doing what is right and avoiding what is wrong. While on the other hand epistemic virtues are more focused on our thoughts and our own person beliefs.

Overview
Being an epistemically virtuous person is often equated with being a critical thinker and focuses on the human agent and the kind of practices that make it possible to arrive at the best accessible approximation of the truth.

Epistemic virtues include conscientiousness as well as the following:
 attentiveness
 benevolence (principle of charity)
 creativity
 curiosity (see below)
 discernment
 honesty
 humility
 objectivity
 parsimony
 studiousness
 understanding
 warranty
 wisdom

These can be contrasted to the epistemic vices such as:
 closed-mindedness
 curiosity (see below)
 dogmatism
 epistemic blindness
 folly
 gullibility
 intellectual dishonesty
 obtuseness
 self-deception
 superficiality of thought
 superstition
 willful naïveté
 wishful thinking

Note that, in this context, curiosity bears the medieval connotation of attraction to unwholesome things, in contrast to the positive studious (or perhaps inquisitive).

See also 
 Egocentrism
 Intellectual virtue

Notes

References 
 W. Jay Wood, Epistemology: Becoming Intellectually Virtuous (InterVarsity Press, 1998)
 Robert C. Roberts and W. Jay Wood, Intellectual Virtues: An Essay in Regulative Epistemology (Oxford University Press, 2007)
 Linda Zagzebski, Virtues of the Mind (Cambridge University Press, 1996)
 Michael DePaul and Linda Zagzebski, eds. Intellectual Virtue (Oxford University Press, 2003)
 Lorraine Daston and Peter Galison, Objectivity (Zone Books, 2007)
Baril, Anne. "The Role of Epistemic Virtue in the Realization of Basic Goods." Episteme: A Journal of Individual and Social Epistemology, vol. 13, no. 4, Jan. 2016, pp. 379–395. EBSCOhost, search.ebscohost.com/login.aspx?direct=true&db=pif&AN=PHL2346569&site=ehost-live

External links 

 
 
 
 
 Epistemic akrasia (irrationality) as a deficit of virtue by Christopher Hookway
 Is Inclusion an Epistemic Virtue? by Harvey Siegel
 Review of James Montmarquet's Epistemic Virtue and Doxastic Responsibility by Jonathan L. Kvanvig

Virtue
Concepts in epistemology